The 2008 Dutch TT was the ninth round of the 2008 MotoGP championship. It took place on the weekend of 26–28 June 2008 at the TT Circuit Assen.

MotoGP classification

250 cc classification

125 cc classification
The 125cc race was stopped after 9 laps due to rain. It was later restarted for 5 additional laps, with the grid determined by the running order before the suspension. The second part of the race determined the final result.

Championship standings after the race (MotoGP)

Below are the standings for the top five riders and constructors after round nine has concluded. 

Riders' Championship standings

Constructors' Championship standings

 Note: Only the top five positions are included for both sets of standings.

References

Dutch TT
Dutch
Tourist Trophy